Arbutus andrachne, commonly called the Greek strawberry tree, is an evergreen shrub or small tree in the family Ericaceae, native to the Mediterranean region and the Middle East.

The etymology of the species name corresponds to the Ancient Greek word , meaning "wild strawberry", and refers to the common name of the tree and to its fruits.

Description 
Arbutus andrachne can reach a height of about 12 metres. The smooth bark is exfoliating during the summer, leaving a layer with a pistachio green colour, which changes gradually to a beautiful orange brown. The flowers bloom in spring and are white or yellowish green. Its fruits ripen in autumn, and when left to dry in a cool place, are eaten as sweet, chewy candy.

According to a research study done by Alzoubi, the A. andrachne fruit's antioxidants contain a variety of chemicals that have a defensive effect against memory impairment where the antioxidants normalize the long- and short-term memory impairment caused from sleep deprivation.

Horticulture

Hybrids 
 Arbutus x andrachnoides Link, 1821 is a hybrid between A. andrachne and A. unedo.
 Arbutus x thuretiana Demoly, nothosp. nov. is a hybrid between A. andrachne and A. canariensis. Named after Gustave Thuret, it is naturalised at Jardin botanique de la Villa Thuret. A. x thuretiana is renowned for its perfectly smooth, reddish-brown bark, exfoliating in the spring to show a new, surprisingly pistachio-green bark, which gradually darkens and turns reddish again.

Garden history 
Arbutus andrachne was reported by Peter Collinson as having flowered first in England in Dr John Fothergill's extensive botanical garden and greenhouses at Upton House, Essex (now West Ham Park), in 1765.

In literature 
"On leaving Bursa ... There was on the road a small tree bearing a fruit somewhat bigger than our largest cherries, and of the shape and taste of strawberries, but a little acid. It is pleasant to eat; but, if a great quantity be eaten, it mounts to the head, and intoxicates. It is ripe in November and December." Editor's footnote: "From the description, it seems to be the arbutus Andrachne." The tree appears to exist in Dibbeen Forest Reserve in Jordan with its distinctive reddish bark that appears more red during and immediately after rain. Locals confirm that the fruits have narcotic-like effect. The fruits are reddish and sweet but taste more like figs.

Gallery

References 

andrachne
Plants described in 1759
Trees of Mediterranean climate
Trees of Europe
Flora of Cyprus
Taxa named by Carl Linnaeus
Flora of the Mediterranean Basin